Nature Reviews Neuroscience is a monthly peer-reviewed review journal published by Nature Portfolio. It was established in 2000. The editor-in-chief is Darran Yates.

Abstracting and indexing
The journal is abstracted and indexed in:

PubMed/MEDLINE
Science Citation Index Expanded
Scopus

According to the Journal Citation Reports, the journal has a 2021 impact factor of 38.755, ranking it 1st out of 274 journals in the category "Neurosciences".

See also

List of scientific journals
Nature (journal)
:Category:Nature Research academic journals

External links

References

Neuroscience journals
Nature Research academic journals
Monthly journals
English-language journals
Publications established in 2000
Review journals